Stipanovci  is a village in Croatia. It is served by the D515 highway.

References

Populated places in Osijek-Baranja County